Ultimando is the sixth studio album by Argentine metal band Almafuerte recorded in 2003 and released the same year by Dejesu Records.

Tracks
"Patria al hombro" [Homeland on Shoulder]- 3:43
"Ultranza"- 2:43
"Todo es en vano, si no hay amor" [All Is In Vain If There Is No Love]- 3:34
"Con rumbo al abra"- 4:32 [On The Way to The Valley
"Ruta 76" [Route 76]- 3:55
"Del fumador" [From The Smoker]- 2:52
"En este viaje" [In This Trip]- 4:43
"Yo traigo la semilla" [I Bring The Seed]- 4:01
"T.C."- 2:34
"Sojuzgados y sometidos" [Subjugated And Subjected]- 3:29
"Como estaba ahí Dios" [As It Was There God]- 3:11

Members
 Ricardo Iorio - vocals
 Claudio Marciello - guitars
 Roberto Ceriotti - bass
 Adrian "Bin" Valencia - drums

2003 albums
Almafuerte (band) albums